Ulaski may refer to:

Ulaski, Łódź Voivodeship (central Poland)
Ulaski, Maków County in Masovian Voivodeship (east-central Poland)
Ulaski, Pułtusk County in Masovian Voivodeship (east-central Poland)